The Moses and Mary Hart Stone House and Ranch Complex, in Malheur County, Oregon near Westfall, is a historic property that is listed on the National Register of Historic Places.  It includes Italianate architecture.  Also known as the Mose Hart Stone House, it was listed on the National Register of Historic Places in 2001.
The house's design is a copy of the Rinehart Stone House built in 1872 in Vale, Oregon.  In 2000, it was identified as endangered and valuable:  as "an intact, rare example of Vernacular-Italianate style architecture...one of the finest examples of pioneer architecture in eastern Oregon."  According to the NRHP nomination, it had been identified by authors Nielsen and Galbreath in Oregon's Fading Past, as "an architecture gem, soon to be forever lost unless restoration
occurs in the near future."

See also
 National Register of Historic Places listings in Malheur County, Oregon

References 

Houses on the National Register of Historic Places in Oregon
Italianate architecture in Oregon
Houses completed in 1898
National Register of Historic Places in Malheur County, Oregon
1898 establishments in Oregon
Houses in Malheur County, Oregon